Fred Sowerby (Frederick Oliver Newgent Sowerby; born December 11, 1948) is a track and field athlete from Antigua and Barbuda, known primarily for running the 400 metres.

Biography
At the 1976 Summer Olympics, he was eliminated by finishing seventh in the quarterfinals while running more than two seconds slower than his personal best of 45.6, set earlier that year.  He also anchored his team, finishing last in their qualifying round.  Sowerby still holds the Antiguan and Barbudan national records in the 400 metres, and 400 metres hurdles.

He is also a three-time champion in the now defunct 600 yard dash at the USA Indoor Track and Field Championships.  Sowerby is a 1973 graduate of Murray State University, where he was elected to the Athletic Hall of Fame in 1986.

Sowerby, had a successful career as head track and field coach of Delaware State University, receiving several Coach of the year awards.  He then relocated to his Alma Mater, Murray State University, where he coached the track teams to several victories until 1993.

After moving to Las Vegas, Nevada, where he was an assistant coach for the University of Nevada, Las Vegas, Sowerby has continued to run in Masters athletics wearing the United States uniform, setting the World Masters Athletics World Record in the M45 and M50 age divisions in 1994 and 1999 respectively.  Sowerby also still holds the World M45 Record for the Indoor 400, set in 1994.

Sowerby  currently is retired from collegiate athletics although he coaches track and is a substitute teacher at Hopkinsville High School and lives in Hopkinsville, Kentucky with his wife, Carolyn. He has six children: Brian, Vaedra, Fred, Jr., LaTonya, Terrance, and Stephon.

External links

References

1948 births
Living people
Antigua and Barbuda male hurdlers
Antigua and Barbuda male sprinters
Athletes (track and field) at the 1976 Summer Olympics
Olympic athletes of Antigua and Barbuda
Athletes (track and field) at the 1966 British Empire and Commonwealth Games
Athletes (track and field) at the 1970 British Commonwealth Games
Athletes (track and field) at the 1978 Commonwealth Games
Athletes (track and field) at the 1979 Pan American Games
Commonwealth Games competitors for Antigua and Barbuda
Pan American Games competitors for Antigua and Barbuda
Antigua and Barbuda masters athletes
Murray State University alumni
World record holders in masters athletics
Montserratian emigrants to Antigua and Barbuda
Antigua and Barbuda expatriate sportspeople in the United States